Elachista morwenella is a moth of the family Elachistidae. It is found in Canada, where it has been recorded from British Columbia.

References

morwenella
Moths described in 1999
Moths of North America
Organisms named after Tolkien and his works